David Cleveland Joseph (born May 6, 1977) is a United States district judge of the United States District Court for the Western District of Louisiana. He was previously United States Attorney for the same district.

Education 

Joseph received his Bachelor of Business Administration from the University of Oklahoma and his Juris Doctor from the Paul M. Hebert Law Center at Louisiana State University, where he was a member of the Louisiana Law Review and was inducted into the Order of the Coif. After graduating, he clerked for Associate Justice Jeffrey P. Victory of the Louisiana Supreme Court and Judge John Victor Parker of the United States District Court for the Middle District of Louisiana.

Career 

Prior to joining the Department of Justice, he served as a prosecutor in the U.S. Army Judge Advocate General's Corps, as an attorney in the Professional Liability & Financial Crimes Section of the Federal Deposit Insurance Corporation, and as an associate in the law firms Fulbright & Jaworski and Kane, Russell, Coleman & Logan, PC.

Joseph previously served as an assistant United States attorney for the Western District of Louisiana, where he prosecuted a wide variety of offenses, with a focus on fraud, public corruption, white-collar crime, and crimes committed on the district's military installations.

United States attorney 

On February 16, 2018, President Trump announced Joseph as the nominee to be United States Attorney for the Western District of Louisiana. On March 22, 2018, his nomination was reported out of Senate Judiciary Committee by voice vote. He was confirmed by voice vote later the same day. He was sworn in on March 30, 2018. His service as U.S. Attorney ended on August 3, 2020, when he resigned to become a federal judge.

Federal judicial service 

On November 20, 2019, President Donald Trump announced his intent to nominate Joseph to serve as a United States district judge for the United States District Court for the Western District of Louisiana. 

On December 2, 2019, his nomination was sent to the Senate. President Trump nominated Joseph to the seat vacated by Judge Dee D. Drell, who assumed senior status on November 30, 2017. On January 3, 2020, his nomination was returned to the President under Rule XXXI, Paragraph 6 of the United States Senate. 

On January 6, 2020, his renomination was sent to the Senate. A hearing on his nomination before the Senate Judiciary Committee was held on January 8, 2020. On May 14, 2020, his nomination was reported out of committee by a 12–10 vote. On July 28, 2020, the United States Senate invoked cloture on his nomination by a 55–42 vote. His nomination was confirmed later that day by a 55–42 vote. He received his judicial commission on July 31, 2020.

References

External links 
 

|-

1977 births
Living people
21st-century American lawyers
21st-century American judges
Assistant United States Attorneys
United States Army Judge Advocate General's Corps
Judges of the United States District Court for the Western District of Louisiana
Lawyers from Dallas
Louisiana lawyers
Louisiana National Guard personnel
Louisiana State University Law Center alumni
Oklahoma National Guard personnel
Texas lawyers
Trump administration personnel
United States Army soldiers
United States Attorneys for the Western District of Louisiana
United States district court judges appointed by Donald Trump
University of Oklahoma alumni